The 1955 LPGA Championship was the first edition of the LPGA Championship, held July 15–17 at Orchard Ridge Country Club in Fort Wayne, Indiana.

The championship's format was three rounds of stroke play, followed by match play on Sunday to determine the final standings. The championship match was played over 36 holes and the other matches were over 18 holes. Rain washed out play on Thursday and delayed the start to late morning on Friday; 36 holes were played on Saturday.

Beverly Hanson won the first of her three major championships at 4 & 3 over runner-up Louise Suggs.

Final leaderboard
Sunday, July 17, 1955

Source:

References

External links
Orchard Ridge Country Club

Women's PGA Championship
Golf in Indiana
Sports in Fort Wayne, Indiana
LPGA Championship
LPGA Championship
LPGA Championship
LPGA Championship
Women's sports in Indiana